Baker is an unincorporated community in Brown County, Kansas, United States.

History
Baker was laid out in 1882 by the Missouri Pacific Railroad; the town was named for the Baker family, the original owners of the town site. A post office was opened in Baker in 1882, and remained in operation until it was discontinued in 1933.

References

Further reading

External links
 Brown County maps: Current, Historic, KDOT

Unincorporated communities in Brown County, Kansas
Unincorporated communities in Kansas
1882 establishments in Kansas
Populated places established in 1882